This is a list of player movements for Super Rugby teams prior to the end of the 2020 Super Rugby season. Departure and arrivals of all players that were included in a Super Rugby squad for 2019 or 2020 are listed here, regardless of when it occurred. Future-dated transfers are only included if confirmed by the player or his agent, his former team or his new team.

Notes
 The 2019 players listed are all players that were named in the initial senior squad, or subsequently included in a 23-man match day squad at any game during the season.
 (did not play) denotes that a player did not play at all during one of the two seasons due to injury or non-selection. These players are included to indicate they were contracted to the team. For the 2020 season, Super Rugby was suspended after seven rounds of matches due to the COVID-19 pandemic, with regional tournaments taking place there after. Players listed as "did not play" did not feature in any of the seven rounds of matches played that season.
 (short-term) denotes that a player wasn't initially contracted, but came in during the season. This could either be a club rugby player coming in as injury cover, or a player whose contract had expired at another team (typically in the northern hemisphere).
 Flags are only shown for players moving to or from another country.
 Players may play in several positions, but are listed in only one.

Brumbies

Rebels

Reds

Waratahs

See also

 List of 2019–20 Premiership Rugby transfers
 List of 2019–20 Pro14 transfers
 List of 2019–20 Top 14 transfers
 List of 2019–20 RFU Championship transfers
 List of 2019–20 Major League Rugby transfers
 SANZAAR
 Super Rugby franchise areas

References

2019
2019 Super Rugby season
2020 Super Rugby season